Christian Levrat (born 7 July 1970) is a Swiss politician. He served as the President of the Social Democratic Party of Switzerland from 2008 until 2020. He has served as a member of the Council of States from Fribourg since 2012. Prior to the Council of states, He was a member of the National Council in from 2003 to 2012.

Levrat was born in La Tour-de-Trême, now part of Bulle in the Canton of Fribourg. He earned a bilingual law degree from University of Fribourg and a master's degree at the University of Leicester.

He has citizenship in Pont (Veveyse), Le Crêt, Esmonts et Siviriez.

In 2008, he was elected as the President of the Social Democratic Party, succeeding  Hans-Jürg Fehr, who resigned after a weak showing in the 2007 Swiss federal election. He led the party for 12 years and stepped down in October 2020 after the Cédric Wermuth and Mattea Meyer as Co-Presidents.

He was elected to the Council of States in 2012, taking 54.2 percent of the vote over Jacques Bourgeois of the FDP. The Liberals.

References

External links
Parliament Bio

1970 births
Living people
Social Democratic Party of Switzerland politicians
Members of the Council of States (Switzerland)
Members of the National Council (Switzerland)
University of Fribourg alumni
Alumni of the University of Leicester
21st-century Swiss politicians